"Stay Another Day" is a song recorded by British boy band East 17, released on 21 November 1994, as the third single from their second album, Steam (1994). It is their only number-one song on the UK Singles Chart, becoming the Christmas number one of 1994, despite not being a Christmas song. "Stay Another Day" also topped the charts of Denmark, Ireland, and Sweden and peaked within the top 10 of the charts in several other countries, including Australia, France, and the Netherlands.

Background
"Stay Another Day" was the third single from East 17's second album, Steam, following up "Around the World" and the album's title track. It was their first ballad, written by the band's lead songwriter Tony Mortimer about the suicide of his brother Ollie. Mortimer explained:  Mortimer was aided in the composition by his co-manager Rob Kean and songwriter Dominic Hawken, who had once been Boy George's keyboard player. Christmas bells were included towards the end of the song to appeal to the lucrative Christmas singles market. The most familiar arrangement is unusual among pop records in that it uses almost no drums, save for timpani rolls during the introduction and towards the end of the track.

Reception

Commercial reception
In late November 1994, "Stay Another Day" entered at number seven on the UK Singles Chart. The following week it climbed to its peak of number one. For the last three weeks of the year, "Stay Another Day" faced stiff competition for the 1994 Christmas number-one from the popular Mariah Carey single "All I Want for Christmas Is You". It outsold Carey's hit single for the weeks commencing 11, 18 and 25 December, selling roughly 130,000, 120,000 and 160,000 copies respectively. The sales lead over Carey in the week before Christmas was around 60,000, and thus securing 1994's Christmas number one to East 17.

It was also the 4th biggest selling boy band single of the 1990s in the United Kingdom. The single is also the 31st biggest seller of the 90s decade. As of December 2019, the single has accrued 1.14 million charts sales, including streams.

Tony Mortimer won an Ivor Novello songwriting award for this song. The single was also nominated for 'Best Single' at the 1995 Brit Awards.

"Stay Another Day" was not released as a single in the United States; however, after its success in the UK it went on to become a major hit all over Europe and internationally, topping the charts in five European countries, as well as reaching the top spot in Zimbabwe and reaching the Top 3 in Australia.

Critical reception
The song received largely positive reviews from critics. Ross Jones from The Guardian felt that "teen-town's hard men show their soft side on a Christmas number one contender" and "a beautiful thing". James Masterton noted in his weekly UK chart commentary, "East 17 prove that there is more to them than the usual 'bad boy' image and sing in astonishingly perfect harmony to create what is certain to be one of the biggest seasonal successes, especially when you consider they were a fixture of the Christmas charts last year with "Its Alright"." Pan-European magazine Music & Media wrote, "Like anybody else the Walthamstowe posse knows that this time of the year is reserved for woeful ballads. The "less sad", "even more sad" and "not so sad" remixes, however, have a club spirit." Alan Jones from Music Week gave the song five out of five, naming it Pick of the Week. He wrote, "This exquisitely arranged, close harmony ballad, piano-led and draped with strings, is a hot favourite for the Christmas number one but may fail by being released a tad too early. East 17's most accomplished piece of work yet, and a song that will be played in years to come, long after Steam has evaporated." A reviewer from Sunday Mirror commented, "A tinkling piano, a gorgeous melody, a sweet and soulful lead vocal those little devils East 17 have gone all angelic for Christmas. The result, a slow and lovelorn ballad called "Stay Another Day"".

Music videos
Two music videos were made for the song. One video features the band recording and performing the song in a studio. The other video features the band in a black background. The group are seen wearing white fur trimmed parkas and black leather jackets. A woman wearing a dress and veil also appears whilst it snows. The latter video is shown usually around Christmas, while the first version is shown outside Christmas. The black-and-white video version was published on YouTube in September 2017. As of September 2021, it has amassed more than 8.2 million views.

Legacy
British newspaper The Guardian ranked "Stay Another Day" number 41 in their list of "The 100 greatest UK No 1s" in 2020. Ben Beaumont-Thomas wrote:

"One of the greatest Christmas No 1s of all time is a triumph of emotional candour. It resembles a breakup song with its talk of final kisses, but was written by Tony Mortimer after his brother killed himself. The pain of those sudden calls of 'stay now' is so acute, voicing the suddenness of loss."

The song has featured on Christmas compilation albums and is usually a mainstay on radio during the festive period. However, scepticism remains within the British public as to whether the song should be labelled a Christmas song. In December 2017, YouGov carried out a poll asking the British public whether they agreed if "Stay Another Day" is a Christmas song. Just over one third, or 34% disagreed, while 29% agreed. This left a large proportion of 37% in the don't know category, which includes all of those who were unaware of the song.

Track listings
 CD single
 "Stay Another Day" (S.A.D. mix) – 4:29
 "Stay Another Day" (less sad mix) – 4:42

 CD maxi – UK (LONCD354)
 "Stay Another Day" (S.A.D. mix) – 4:29
 "Stay Another Day" (less sad mix) – 4:44
 "Stay Another Day" (more sad mix) – 8:34
 "Stay Another Day" (not so sad mix) – 6:16

Charts

Weekly charts

Year-end charts

Certifications

|-

Girls Aloud version

Background 
Girls Aloud were formed through Popstars: The Rivals by a public vote on 30 November 2002. The concept of the programme was to produce a boyband and a girlband who would be "rivals" and compete for the Christmas number one single in 2002.  Girls Aloud competed against One True Voice, managed by music producer Pete Waterman.  Girls Aloud recorded a cover version of "Stay Another Day", intended as their debut single, with Cheryl Cole providing lead vocals. After Girls Aloud recorded "Sound of the Underground", "Stay Another Day" was instead released as its B-side. The release was originally meant to be a double A-side, and it is often mistakenly labelled as such. "Stay Another Day" was performed on This Morning, Top of the Pops and Top of the Pops Saturday to promote its parent single.

Girls Aloud gave the song a "romantic slant," which surprised East 17's Mortimer since it is about his brother's suicide. Mortimer said, "I found it really odd they were singing a song about my dead brother. It should've been left alone for a few years," adding that he did like Girls Aloud.

Reception
Colin Paterson of The Guardian remarked on the unoriginality of Girls Aloud's cover: "A group formed on a TV show by a phone poll and then doing a cover of a former Christmas No 1. Life seldom gets less imaginative." 
Backing vocals were also provided by Esther & Vernie Bennett of fellow UK Girl-group ‘Eternal’

Waltham Forest Youth Choir version
On 3 December 2019, London Recordings uploaded a new version of the song to YouTube, performed by Waltham Forest Youth Choir, with Mortimer on piano. Mortimer himself appears in the video. The track was released to raise money for mental health charity CALM.

References

1990s ballads
1994 singles
1994 songs
Black-and-white music videos
Christmas number-one singles in the United Kingdom
East 17 songs
Irish Singles Chart number-one singles
Kylie Minogue songs
Number-one singles in Denmark
Number-one singles in Scotland
Number-one singles in Sweden
Number-one singles in Zimbabwe
Pop ballads
Song recordings produced by Phil Harding (producer)
Songs about suicide
Commemoration songs
Songs written by Tony Mortimer
UK Singles Chart number-one singles